The 1976–77 Southern Football League season was the 74th in the history of the league, an English football competition. It was the first Southern Football League season to use goal difference as a tie-breaker.

Wimbledon won the championship, winning their third Southern League title in a row and was elected to the Football League replacing Workington, whilst Worcester City, Barnet, Cheltenham Town and Hastings United were all promoted to the Premier Division, the former two as champions. Metropolitan Police left the league to join the Isthmian League.

Premier Division
The Premier Division consisted of 22 clubs, including 18 clubs from the previous season and four new clubs:
Two clubs promoted from Division One North:
Redditch United
AP Leamington

Two clubs promoted from Division One South:
Dartford
Minehead

Wimbledon was elected to the Football League in place of Workington. Thus, Telford United remained in the division.

League table

Division One North
Division One North consisted of 20 clubs, including 17 clubs from the previous season and three clubs, all from the Premier Division:
Cambridge City
Dunstable    
Stourbridge

League table

Division One South
Division One South consisted of 18 clubs, including 15 clubs from the previous season and three new clubs:
Aylesbury United, promoted from the Athenian League
Barnet, transferred from the North Division
Tonbridge Angels, demoted from the Premier Division

League table

Football League elections
At the end of the season, the bottom four of the Football League had to be re-elected to retain their place. Whilst in previous seasons the number of non-League applicants had been unlimited, this season saw the Football League Management Committee limit the number to two, with Wimbledon and Northern Premier League members Altrincham (who had finished tenth) entering the ballot. The top four in the vote would retain/win a place in the League.

With 27 votes, Wimbledon finished fourth in the election, earning a place in the League at the expense of Workington, who dropped into the Northern Premier League.

See also
 Southern Football League
 1976–77 Northern Premier League

References

Southern Football League seasons
S